El Arabi Hilal Soudani (born 25 November 1987) is an Algerian professional footballer who plays as a forward for Saudi Professional League club Damac and the Algeria national team.

Soudani made his international debut in 2010, and featured at the 2013, 2015 and 2017 editions of the Africa Cup of Nations, as well as the 2014 FIFA World Cup in Brazil. As of November 2019, he has won 54 international caps and scored 24 goals, making him Algeria's sixth-highest goalscorer in history.

Club career

ASO Chlef
Born in Chlef, Soudani began his career in the junior ranks of his hometown club ASO Chlef. In May 2006, aged 19, he made his first team debut for the club as a substitute against USM Annaba in the 28th round of the 2005–06 Algerian Championnat National, coming on for Samir Zaoui in the 72nd minute.

In 2008, Soudani was chosen as the 2008 Young Player of the Year by DZFoot after scoring 11 goals in 24 games in the 2007–08 season.

In June 2011, Soudani went on trial with French Ligue 2 club Le Mans FC.

Vitória de Guimarães
On 8 August 2011, Soudani signed a three-year contract with Portuguese club Vitória de Guimarães. The transfer fee was rumoured to be €800,000. On 25 August 2011, Soudani made his official debut for Vitória as a 66th-minute substitute in a 2011–12 UEFA Europa League play-off round match against Atlético Madrid. On 16 October 2011, Soudani opened his scoring account for the club with a brace in the third round of the 2011–12 Taça de Portugal against Moura Atlético Clube. After trailing 1–0, Soudani scored the equaliser in the 89th minute of the match to send the match to extra-time, before scoring the winner in the 117th minute. On 1 April 2012, he scored his first goal in the Primeira Liga in a 3–1 win against Paços de Ferreira. On 21 April, he scored a brace in a 3–2 win against União de Leiria.

On 26 May 2013, Soudani helped Vitória win their first ever Taça de Portugal by beating Benfica 2–1 in the final, scoring the equalising goal in the 79th minute before Ricardo Pereira scored the winner two minutes later. The following day, he travelled to Croatia to complete a medical ahead of a transfer to Dinamo Zagreb.

Dinamo Zagreb
On 27 May 2013, Soudani signed a four-year contract with Croatian champions Dinamo Zagreb after the club paid a €900,000 transfer fee for his services.

On 6 July 2013, Soudani won the Croatian Supercup with Dinamo against Hajduk Split, also making his debut for Dinamo in the match. He made his Croatian First Football League debut six days later, scoring in a 3–1 win over Osijek. He then scored twice and assisted another goal in Dinamo's 5-0 win over Fola Esch in UEFA Champions League qualifying. Soudani won the Croatian league championship, scoring 16 goals and finishing third in the Golden Boot race behind Dinamo teammates Andrej Kramarić (18) and Duje Čop (22).

In the 2014–15 season, Soudani scored a hat-trick against Astra Giurgiu in the 2014–15 UEFA Europa League group stage. He won his second league championship with Dinamo, scoring 11 goals and assisting 15 in the league, and won his first Croatian Cup.

Soudani's Dinamo completed the league and cup double again in the 2015–16 season, however the player himself had a less successful season, battling injuries and form and finished with eight goals and four assists in the league.

In the 2016–17 season, Soudani's 95th minute extra time goal against Red Bull Salzburg sent Dinamo through to the group stage of the 2016–17 UEFA Champions League. Despite finishing second in the league behind Rijeka — the first time Dinamo had not won the league in 10 seasons — Soudani achieved a career-best 17 goals in the league.

Nottingham Forest
On 29 June 2018, Soudani joined English club Nottingham Forest on a three-year contract for an undisclosed transfer fee. In the opening four matches of the season, Soudani scored twice before he injured his knee. In October, Soudani then incurred a serious injury to his leg which kept him out of play for the remainder of Nottingham's season.

Olympiacos
On 18 June 2019, Soudani joined Greek club Olympiacos on a permanent transfer. By mid-November 2019, despite not being in manager Pedro Martins' plans at the beginning of the season, he had made his way into the starting 11 with a series of good performances. In 532 minutes of play, he scored five goals and contributed one assist and was the team's leading scorer in Super League Greece.

On 20 February 2020, in a 1–0 victory against Atromitos, Soudani sustained an anterior cruciate ligament (ACL) injury which was forecast to keep him out of action for at least six months.

On 25 January 2021, after being deemed surplus to requirements by Martins, he was released by mutual consent, six months before the official expiry of his contract.

International career
In February 2011, Soudani was selected by head coach Abdelhak Benchikha as part of the Algerian A' national team for the 2011 African Nations Championship in Sudan. In the opening group stage match, against Uganda, Soudani started and scored a goal in the 61st minute as Algeria won 2–0. In the second group match, against Gabon, Soudani scored a brace with goals in the 71st and 90th minute of the match in a 2–2 draw. Despite not scoring in the remainder of the competition, Soudani finished as one of the top scorers in the competition with three goals.

On 14 May 2011, Soudani was called-up by Abdelhak Benchikha to the Algeria national team for the first time for a 2012 Africa Cup of Nations qualifier against Morocco. On 4 June 2011, he made his debut as a substitute for Rafik Djebbour in the 79th minute of the match.

Career statistics

Club

International

International goals
Scores and results list Algeria's goal tally first, score column indicates score after each Soudani goal.

Algeria A'

Honours
ASO Chlef
 Algerian Ligue Professionnelle 1: 2010–11

Vitória Guimarães
 Taça de Portugal: 2013

Dinamo Zagreb
 Croatian First League: 2013–14, 2014–15, 2015–16, 2017–18
 Croatian Cup: 2015, 2016, 2018
 Croatian Super Cup: 2013

Olympiacos
 Super League Greece: 2019–20
 Greek Cup: 2019–20

Algeria
FIFA Arab Cup: 2021

Individual
 Algerian Ligue Professionnelle 1 Footballer of the Year: 2010–11
 DZFoot Young Player of the Year: 2008 
 DZFoot d'Or: 2013
Football Oscar: Best Prva HNL player 2018
Football Oscar Team Of The Year: 2014, 2017, 2018
 Prva HNL Player of the Year (Tportal): 2017
 African Nations Championship top scorer: 2011 (three goals)
 Algerian Ligue Professionnelle 1 top scorer: 2010–11 (18 goals)
 Africa Cup of Nations qualifiers Top scorer: 2017  (seven goals)
 Croatian First Football League top scorer: 2017–18 (17 goals)
 Croatian First_Football League top assists: 2014-15

References

External links

1987 births
Living people
People from Chlef
Algerian footballers
Association football forwards
Association football wingers
Algeria international footballers
Algeria A' international footballers
2011 African Nations Championship players
2013 Africa Cup of Nations players
2014 FIFA World Cup players
2015 Africa Cup of Nations players
2017 Africa Cup of Nations players
Algerian Ligue Professionnelle 1 players
Primeira Liga players
Croatian Football League players
English Football League players
Super League Greece players
Saudi Professional League players
ASO Chlef players
Vitória S.C. players
GNK Dinamo Zagreb players
Nottingham Forest F.C. players
Olympiacos F.C. players
Al-Fateh SC players
Damac FC players
Algerian expatriate footballers
Algerian expatriate sportspeople in Portugal
Expatriate footballers in Portugal
Expatriate footballers in Croatia
Algerian expatriate sportspeople in England
Expatriate footballers in England
Algerian expatriate sportspeople in Greece
Expatriate footballers in Greece
Algerian expatriate sportspeople in Saudi Arabia
Expatriate footballers in Saudi Arabia
21st-century Algerian people